Manacapuru (Munychapur) is a municipality located in the Brazilian state of Amazonas.

Population
The population of Manacapuru was 98,502 (2020) and its area is 7,329 km². The city is one of the biggest in the state.

Main sights
The municipality contains about 19% of the Rio Negro Right Bank Environmental Protection Area, a  sustainable use conservation unit that controls use of an area of Amazon rainforest along the Rio Negro above the junction with the Solimões River.
It also contains about 4% of the Rio Negro Sustainable Development Reserve, a  sustainable use conservation unit created in 2008 in an effort to stop deforestation in the area, which is threatened due to its proximity to Manaus.

Notable people
 Marcelinho – Footballer, playing for the Bulgarian national football team.

References

Municipalities in Amazonas (Brazilian state)
Populated places on the Amazon